Giannis Gravanis (16 January 1958 – 30 April 2012) was a Greek footballer.

Career
Born in Domokos, Gravanis began playing football with local side Achilles Domokos. Gravanis joined Panionios in July 1977, and played eleven seasons for the club in the Alpha Ethniki, appearing in 269 league matches. He made his Alpha Ethniki debut on 10 January 1978, and helped Panionios win the 1978–79 Greek Cup final against AEK Athens F.C.

Gravanis made three appearances for the Greece national football team during 1982.

Personal
Gravanis died in a Patras hospital at age 54.

References

1958 births
2012 deaths
People from Domokos
Greek footballers
Greece international footballers
Panionios F.C. players
Panachaiki F.C. players
Association football defenders
Footballers from Central Greece